Wurmbea decumbens is a species of plant in the Colchicaceae family that is endemic to South Australia.

Distribution
The species is found on South Australia's Eyre Peninsula.

References

decumbens
Monocots of Australia
Flora of South Australia
Plants described in 1995
Taxa named by Robert John Bates